The 2021–22 season is the 64th season in the club history of the handball branch of Zamalek, the season began with African Handball Super Cup on the 10th of September 2021, as Zamalek competes for the Egyptian Handball League, Egypt Handball Cup and IHF Super Globe.

Current squad

Staff
Staff for the 2020–21 season.

Team
Squad for the 2021–22 season.

Competitions

Overview

2021 African Super Cup 

The season began with the African Handball Super Cup on the 10th of September 2021, and ended with Zamalek achieving the African title for the 7th times in the Club History.

2021 IHF Super Globe 
This competition was held in a knock-out format starting from the quarterfinals qualification, and 10 teams participated in this competition, Zamalek began directly from the quarterfinals.

Quarter-finals

Placement round 5–10 
Group B

Egyptian League

First stage 

Note First Team Got 9 Points From Team 2002, After Get the 1st Place in the First Stage of the 2002 League.
Note First Team Got 7.5 Points From Team 2004, After Get the 4th Place in the First Stage of the 2004 League.

Matches 

(Round 1)

(Round 2)

(Round 3)

(Round 4)

(Round 5)

(Round 6)

(Round 7)

(Round 8)

(Round 9)

(Round 10)

(Round 11)

(Round 12)

(Round 13)

(Round 14)

(Round 15)

(Round 16)

(Round 17)

Second stage 

Note First Team Got Extra 5 Points After Winning on the Five Teams that Qualified for the Second Stage.
Note First Team Got 3 Points From Team 2002, After Get the 1st Place in the Second Stage of the 2002 League.
Note First Team Got 3 Points From Team 2004, After Get the 1st Place in the Second Stage of the 2004 League.

Matches 

(Round 1)

(Round 2)

(Round 3)

(Round 4)

(Round 5)

(Round 6)

(Round 7)

(Round 8)

(Round 9)

(Round 10)

Final stage 

Note First Team Got Extra 2 Points After Winning on the Two Teams that Qualified for the Final Stage.

Matches 

(Round 1)

(Round 2)

(Round 3)

(Round 4)

(Round 5)

(Round 6)

Egyptian Cup 
(Round of 16)

(Quarter-finals)

(Semi-finals)

(Finals)

Pro Super Cup

Matches 
(Round 1)

(Round 2)

(Round 3)

2022 African Super Cup

African Cup Winners' Cup

Matches 
(Round 1)

(Round 2)

(Round 3)

(Quarter-Finals)

(Semi-Finals)

(Finals)

Records and Statistics 

 Season Topscorer : Ahmed El-Ahmar (254 Goals)
 Biggest Win : 54–31 Vs Kirkos
 Biggest Defeat : 32–36 Vs Barcelona
 Longest Wins Run : 23 Game
(from 7 October 2021 to 31 January 2022)
 Longest Unbeaten Run : 35 Game
(from 7 October 2021 to 8 April 2022)
 Derby :  6 Win – 2 Draw – 1 Lose

Top Score

References

Zamalek SC
Handball in Egypt
Zamalek SC seasons